The spotted keelback (Xenochrophis maculatus) is a species of snake of the family Colubridae.

Geographic range
The snake is found in Indonesia, Malaysia, Brunei and Singapore.

References 

maculatus
Reptiles described in 1864
Reptiles of Brunei
Reptiles of Malaysia
Reptiles of Indonesia
Reptiles of Borneo